Group D of the 2017 Africa Cup of Nations was played from 17 to 25 January 2017 in Gabon. The group consisted of Ghana, Mali, Egypt, and Uganda.

Egypt and Ghana advanced to the round of 16 as the top two teams.

Teams

Notes

Standings

In the quarter-finals:
The group winners, Egypt, advanced to play the runners-up of Group C, Morocco.
The group runners-up, Ghana, advanced to play the winners of Group C, DR Congo.

Matches
All times are local, WAT (UTC+1).

Ghana vs Uganda

Mali vs Egypt

Ghana vs Mali

Egypt vs Uganda

Egypt vs Ghana

Uganda vs Mali

References

External links
2017 Africa Cup of Nations, CAFonline.com

Group D